IFK Ore is a Swedish ice hockey club, named after Oresjön, the lake on which the club's home town of Furudal is situated.  The club plays in group C of Sweden's third tier league, Division 1, .

External links
 Official website
 Profile on Eliteprospects.com

Ice hockey teams in Sweden
Ore
Ice hockey teams in Dalarna County